Labukovo   is a village in the municipality of Svrljig, Serbia. It had a population of 122 at the 2002 census.

References

Populated places in Nišava District